Hone Taare Tikao (1850 – 11 June 1927) was a New Zealand tribal leader, scholar and politician. Of Māori descent, he identified with the Ngāi Tahu iwi. He was born on Banks Peninsula, New Zealand in about 1850.

He stood at several elections in the Southern Maori electorate. One of his children was the master weaver Raukura Erana Gillies.

References

1850 births
1927 deaths
Māori politicians
Ngāi Tahu people
People from Banks Peninsula
New Zealand Māori writers
Unsuccessful candidates in the 1902 New Zealand general election
Unsuccessful candidates in the 1887 New Zealand general election
19th-century New Zealand politicians